The men's 3x3 basketball tournament at the 2022 Commonwealth Games was held in a temporary Games-time venue at the brownfield site in Smithfield between 29 July and 2 August 2022. The first time a 3x3 basketball tournament was held as part of the Commonwealth Games, hosts England won the gold medal over Australia.

Qualification
England qualified as host nation and the other nations qualified by FIBA 3x3 Federation Ranking. Special arrangements were in place to ascertain the recipient of the quota place earned by Great Britain.

Rosters

Competition format
Eight teams were drawn into two groups. Upon completion of the group stage, the top-ranked team in each group advances directly to the semi-finals; the two middle-ranked teams in each group progress to the quarter-finals.

Group stage
All times based on British Summer Time (UTC+01:00)

Group A

Group B

Knockout stage

Quarter-finals

Semi-finals

Bronze medal match

Gold medal match

Final ranking

References

2022